Tartagal Airport – General Enrique Mosconi   is an airport serving Tartagal, a city in the Salta Province of Argentina. The airport was named after the Argentine military engineer Enrique Mosconi.

The runway length includes a  displaced threshold on Runway 20.

See also

Transport in Argentina
List of airports in Argentina

References

External links
OpenStreetMap - General Mosconi Airport
FallingRain - General Enrique Mosconi Airport

Airports in Argentina